William Chappell may refer to:

William Chappell (bishop) (1582–1649), English scholar and Church of Ireland bishop of Cork and Ross
William Chappell (writer) (1809–1888), English writer on music, a member of the London musical firm of Chappell & Co
William Chappell (Wisconsin politician) (1813–1872), Wisconsin state legislator
William Chappell (dancer) (1907–1994), British dancer, ballet designer and producer
Bill Chappell (1922–1989), U.S. Representative from Florida

See also
William Haighton Chappel (1860–1922), Anglican priest and educator
William Chapple (disambiguation) 
Bill Chappelle (1881–1944), American baseball player